Kazlıçeşme is one of the seven neighborhoods of Zeytinburnu district in Istanbul, Turkey. Chartered in 1957, it is the largest neighborhood of Zeytinburnu. The locality took its name from the historic fountain with a relief goose figure below the fountain's inscription, which dates it back to Hijri year AH 953 (AD 1537).

Stretching between Bakırköy district in the southwest and Fatih district in the northeast, where it borders to the historic Walls of Constantinople, the area covers the entire coast line of Zeytinburnu at the Sea of Marmara.

History
Kazlıçeşme was assigned for slaughterhouse, tannery and chandlery by a decret of Ottoman sultan Mehmed the Conqueror (reigned 1444–46 and 1451–81) soon after the conquest of Constantinople in 1453. Kazlıçeşme was chosen as a place outside the city walls due to the very bad smell produced by ancient tanneries. There were 360 tanneries and 33 butcheries in Kazlıçeşme at a time. The tanneries and the factories of leatherware industry in the area moved in 1993 to a modern industrial zone in Tuzla district on the Asian of Istanbul established for that special purpose. After all the leather industry left Kazlıçeşme, the old factory buildings were demolished, and the area became a big public space, which is used today for political and social activity rallies.

Places of interest

Some of the historic religious buildings in Kazlıçeşme are Kazlıçeşme Fatih Mosque, which is ascribed to Sultan Mehmed the Conqueror and considered so as one of the first two mosques built by Turks in Istanbul, Eriklibaba Tekke and Merzifonlu Kara Mustafa Pasha Masjid.

The multi-purpose indoor venue Abdi İpekçi Arena, demolished in 2018, was situated here. Kazlıçeşme is also the place, where historic buildings of the Greek and Armenian communities, such as the Balıklı Greek Hospital and Yedikule Surp Pırgiç Armenian Hospital, are found.

Transports
The railway station of Kazlıçeşme, which served the Sirkeci-Halkalı commuter rail line was taken out of service on March 1, 2013 in the frame of improvement works for the Marmaray project. With the opening of Marmaray's first stage on October 29, 2013, Kazlıçeşme railway station became the provisory western terminus of the line, which starts at Ayrılıkçeşmesi on the Asiatic part of Istanbul and crosses the Bosphorus undersea.

In the 2000s, the international port was frequently used by Russian and Ukrainian tourists.

Population
The population of Kazlıçeşme in its close timeline is shown in the list below.

References

Zeytinburnu
Neighbourhoods of Istanbul
Port cities and towns in Turkey